Mazanec is a surname, mostly used in Czechia. Notable people with the surname include:

  (also Jiří Filip Massanecz) (1637–1684), Czech painter of the early baroque style
 Marek Mazanec (born 1991), Czech ice hockey player
 Martin Mazanec (born 1989), Czech ice hockey player

Czech-language surnames